Étendard (French, literally "standard" - a banner, and especially a military banner) may refer to:

Aircraft
 Dassault Étendard
 Dassault Étendard II
 Dassault Étendard IV
 Dassault Étendard VI
 Dassault-Breguet Super Étendard

Other uses
 Étendard (train), which ran between Paris and Bordeaux
 Étendard de Brest, a basketball club based in Brest, France